Electron cryotomography (CryoET) is an imaging technique used to produce high-resolution (~1–4 nm) three-dimensional views of samples, often (but not limited to) biological macromolecules and cells. CryoET is a specialized application of transmission electron cryomicroscopy (CryoTEM) in which samples are imaged as they are tilted, resulting in a series of 2D images that can be combined to produce a 3D reconstruction, similar to a CT scan of the human body. In contrast to other electron tomography techniques, samples are imaged under cryogenic conditions (< −150 °C). For cellular material, the structure is immobilized in non-crystalline, vitreous ice, allowing them to be imaged without dehydration or chemical fixation, which would otherwise disrupt or distort biological structures.

Description of technique 

In electron microscopy (EM), samples are imaged in a high vacuum. Such a vacuum is incompatible with biological samples such as cells; the water would boil off, and the difference in pressure would explode the cell. In room-temperature EM techniques, samples are therefore prepared by fixation and dehydration. Another approach to stabilize biological samples, however, is to freeze them (electron cryomicroscopy). As in other electron cryomicroscopy techniques, samples for CryoET (typically small cells such as Bacteria, Archaea, or viruses) are prepared in standard aqueous media and applied to an EM grid. The grid is then plunged into a cryogen (typically liquid ethane) so efficiently such that water molecules do not have time to rearrange into a crystalline lattice. The resulting water state is called "vitreous ice" and preserves native cellular structures, such as lipid membranes, that would normally be destroyed by freezing. Plunge-frozen samples are subsequently stored and imaged at liquid-nitrogen temperatures so that the water never warms enough to crystallize.

Samples are imaged in a transmission electron microscope (TEM). As in other electron tomography techniques, the sample is tilted to different angles relative to the electron beam (typically every 1 or 2 degrees from about −60° to +60°), and an image is acquired at each angle. This tilt-series of images can then be computationally reconstructed into a three-dimensional view of the object of interest. This is called a tomogram, or tomographic reconstruction.

Applications 
In transmission electron microscopy (TEM), because electrons interact strongly with matter, resolution is limited by the thickness of the sample. Also, the thickness of the sample increases as the sample is tilted, and thicker samples can then completely block the electron beam, making the image dark or completely black. Therefore, for CryoET, samples should be less than ~500 nm thick to achieve "macromolecular" resolution (~4 nm). For this reason, most ECT studies have focused on purified macromolecular complexes, viruses, or small cells such as those of many species of Bacteria and Archaea. Cryotomography was used to understand encapsulation of 12 nm size protein cage nanoparticles inside 60 nm sized virus-like nanoparticles.

Larger cells, and even tissues, can be prepared for CryoET by thinning, either by cryo-sectioning or by focused ion beam (FIB) milling. In cryo-sectioning, frozen blocks of cells or tissue are sectioned into thin samples with a cryo-microtome. In FIB-milling, plunge-frozen samples are exposed to a focused beam of ions, typically gallium, that precisely whittle away material from the top and bottom of a sample, leaving a thin lamella suitable for ECT imaging.

The strong interaction of electrons with matter also results in an anisotropic resolution effect. As the sample is tilted during imaging, the electron beam interacts with a relatively greater cross-sectional area at higher tilt angles. In practice, tilt angles greater than approximately 60–70° do not yield much information and are therefore not used. This results in a "missing wedge" of information in the final tomogram that decreases resolution parallel to the electron beam.

For structures that are present in multiple copies in one or multiple tomograms, higher resolution (even ≤1 nm) can be obtained by subtomogram averaging. Similar to single particle analysis, subtomogram averaging computationally combines images of identical objects to increase the signal-to-noise ratio.

A major obstacle in CryoET is identifying structures of interest within complicated cellular environments. One solution is to apply correlated cryo-fluorescence light microscopy, and even super-resolution light microscopy (e.g. cryo-PALM), and CryoET. In these techniques, a sample containing a fluorescently-tagged protein of interest is plunge-frozen and first imaged in a light microscope equipped with a special stage to allow the sample to be kept at sub-crystallization temperatures (< −150 °C). The location of the fluorescent signal is identified and the sample is transferred to the CryoTEM, where the same location is then imaged at high resolution by CryoET.

See also 

 Electron microscopy
 Electron tomography
 Transmission electron cryomicroscopy
 Transmission electron microscopy

References

External links
 Getting started in cryo-EM course (Caltech)

Cell biology
Electron microscopy techniques